The Treasure of the Sierra Madre (originally titled Der Schatz der Sierra Madre) is a 1927 adventure novel by German author B. Traven, whose identity remains unknown. In the book, two destitute American men in Mexico of the 1920s join an older American prospector in a search for gold. John Huston adapted the book as a 1948 film of the same name.

Historical setting
The novel is set in the decade following the global upheavals of the First World War and social revolutions in Russia and Mexico. The United States is an emerging economic and political power. European and US corporations are aggressively seeking foreign markets, natural resources and cheap labor. Elements within the Catholic Church are struggling to retain their authority as liberal Mexican administrations institute social reforms, including an 8-hour day, literacy programs and health care. This is the context of the story.

Plot
The author employs a third person-omniscient in a dramatic-progressive structure, where Howard is the focal character. Three stories within a story provide historical and social significance for the outer narrative.

Summary
The story opens in the oil boomtown of Tampico, Mexico in the early 1920s. Dobbs, an expatriate who hails from “an industrial American city” is unemployed, penniless and reduced to bumming spare change from American tourists. Loitering on Tampico's main plaza, he collects a number of generous handouts from well-to-do men who wear white suits. To Dobbs’ dismay, he discovers that he has been accosting the same individual repeatedly. The irate tourist at last upbraids the panhandler, dismissing him with a half-peso tip.

At the Hotel Oso Negro (the Black Bear Hotel), a vermin-infested flophouse, Dobbs pays for a cot and a cold shower at 50 centavos per night. The hotel clientele comprises both employed and unemployed international workers, as well as a number of gamblers, thieves and tramps. The Oso Negro, nevertheless, is operated efficiently by its sharp-eyed front desk clerks. The guests themselves collectively provide a degree of good order and security.

In a café, a young Mexican lottery vendor exhorts Dobbs to purchase a ticket. Dobbs insults the boy, but finally consents to risk his last 20 centavos on the drawing.

Dobbs lands a gig unloading agricultural machinery at four pesos per day. Desperate for better wages, he joins a rigging crew as a roughneck, run by American contractor Pat McCormick. A shrewd bidder on lucrative drilling projects, McCormick has a reputation for fast-paced operations and high productivity. He postures as an anti-capitalist and comrade to revolutionaries so as to win the loyalty of his newly arrived European laborers, who are sympathetic to Bolshevism. Americans are wise to his phony appeals to worker solidarity and McCormick avoids hiring them. The pay is $8 a day, less $1.80 for meals. The crews work 18-hour shifts, seven days a week for the duration of the project and no overtime pay. Mexican labor is never hired due to their national eight-hour day provision. When the rigging job is completed, the crew is sent back to Tampico to await payment. McCormick advances a few employees 5% of their pay. Dobbs argues for and gets 30% of his earning in cash.

Weeks pass while Dobbs, along with Californian co-worker named Curtin seek the evasive contractor. The men spot McCormick in the central plaza, promenading with his meretricious mistress. When they confront him, he invites the resentful Dobbs and Curtin into a cantina for a drink. Plying the men with liquor, McCormick pleads that he has not yet been reimbursed by the oil company. Curtin curses his lie, while Dobbs thrusts him against the bar, demanding their wages. McCormick, himself a brawler, and capable of beating up the men one-on-one, mentally calculates his losses if he ends up in a hospital after a desperate bar fight against both determined workers. He pulls out the cash he owes Dobbs and Curtin and throws it on the bar top. Vowing to never hire them again, he strides out of the cantina.

When Dobbs returns to the Oso Negro, he encounters the greying Howard, an old-timer who has travelled the world in search of gold. The loquacious old man is holding forth with his bunkmates on the perils of striking it rich. Discovered in quantity, he avers, gold distorts a man's estimate of vice and virtue. Invariably he succumbs to greed, and no amount of gold will satisfy him. Overhearing this, Dobbs becomes agitated, swearing that he is immune to the sinister forces of gold, that he would be happy with a $20,000 fortune, no more. Howard quietly takes the measure of Dobbs with a long look, then returns to his sermon. He assures them that, though no longer in his prime, he is ready to share expenses on a gold-prospecting expedition. Dobbs and the others feel the powerful lure of the precious metal.

Story within a Story: The Legend of La Mina Agua Verde

Dobbs shares the legend of the Green Water Mine with Curtin, and has a premonition that he may be subject to a gold curse. Curtin discounts any “curse” associated with gold and holds that a person's character determines its effects; it may be used for bad or good.

With many oil fields beginning to shut down operation in Mexico and relocate to other countries, the two men are impelled to partner with Howard to seek gold. Curtin is skeptical as to the old man's fitness, but Dobbs assures him that Howard is indispensable to the success of their venture, wondering if the old timer will even entertain shouldering two greenhorn prospectors. Howard gladly consents, and offers to invest the bulk of his savings, $200, towards the endeavor. Dobbs discovers that his lottery ticket has netted 100 pesos, and Curtin, in turn, collects an outstanding loan repayment with interest to the amount of $200. With about $600 in pooled funds, the trio depart immediately by train for the city of Durango, in the Mexican interior.

In Durango, Howard selects a promising region in the remote Sierra Madre Mountains to search for gold. Purchasing supplies and pack animals in local villages they begin their ascent. Dobbs and Curtin are staggered by the hardships they experience in wilderness travel. Several promising sites are tested, but show only traces of gold. The two inexperienced men begin to despair and consider quitting.

Howard suddenly begins to berate his companions, disparaging their pessimism and ignorance. The old man's outburst is such that Dobbs and Curtin suspect he has gone mad. Listening to him, they begin to grasp what he is saying: the keen-eyed miner recognizes that the terrain is laden with placer gold.

An excavation site is selected and the base camp is situated over a mile away for security. The men intend to pose as professional game hunters seeking commercial hides. The approach to the diggings are carefully camouflaged with boulders and trunks. The local people take little interest in their activities and do not molest them. They establish a placer gold operation, using a sluice box, with the water hauled to the apparatus by burros from a nearby creek. Driven by entrepreneurial self-interest, Dobbs and Curtin work to the limits of their endurance. The gold accumulates slowly but surely.

As the fortune piles up, the prospectors' class identity shifts. With property to defend, they adopt a bourgeois outlook, suspicious of the have-nots. They cease to be proletariats. Even as the men share the same hardships, they do not forge friendships, merely alliances for profit. Their willingness to rescue a partner in distress is self-serving: the loss of one man to death or injury could cripple the profitable enterprise.

Months of hard labor and privations in the wilderness begins to show on the men. They are sick of the grub, the monotony of the work regimen and, especially, of one another. Howard has constantly to intervene to defuse fights between the younger men. In a number of violent confrontations, they pull their pistols and come close to shooting each other over trifles.

The miners begin to anticipate the end of the operation and a return to civil society. Curtin raises the question as to how much each gold share will bring in cash. Howard calculates this to be about $15,000 apiece. The claim is beginning to show signs of depletion and the men set a date of departure of 6–8 weeks. They collaborate in planning the safe transportation and conversion of their riches to currency. For the first time in months, they begin to think of their personal futures.

Curtin makes a final resupply trip to the local village. He takes a few hides as usual to sell at the dry goods store; this, to keep up the pretense he is a hunter. Curtin is accosted by a friendly American newcomer visiting the store. The man insinuates that there is much gold in the nearby mountains; Curtin emphatically denies it. The stranger guesses the significance of Curtin's aloofness and trails him into the mountain wilderness.

Without warning, the intruder steps silently into their fire circle. The prospectors are momentarily taken off guard by his arrival. Dobbs recovers, and emphatically tells the man to clear out, but the stranger stands his ground. The miners cunningly ignore the unwelcome guest, and pretend to discuss “hunting” strategies. The stranger bluntly informs them the area is unfit for commercial hunting – rather, they are sitting on a gold field. The prospectors return to their tent intensely suspicious of the man's purpose. They permit him to stay the night. The stranger introduces himself as Robert W. Lacuad of Phoenix, Arizona, “Tech, Pasadena”.

When Howard goes to check the burros, he spots mounted men in the distance approaching the encampment. They are not Mexican soldiers or police. Lacuad warns the miners that the horsemen are dangerous bandits, led by the notorious Gold Hat. Tipped off by locals, they are searching for the “hunter” (Curtin) to seize his guns and ammunition. Lacuad assures his companions that their lives are in imminent danger. As they anxiously watch the bandits slowly ascend the trail, Lacuad relates to them the story of Gold Hat, conveyed to him by a local nobleman, don Genaro Montereal, while visiting his estate the previous week.

Story within a story: Lacaud’s narrative of an incident in the Viva Nuestro Rey Cristo Uprising

The prospectors take up positions in a trench-like ravine with a view of the campsite, fortifying it like a military bunker. Howard assumes command with the consent of the others and holds a war council.

Gold Hat and his men dismount and enter the campsite on foot, expecting to encounter only a lone hunter. Failing to find him, they quarrel and consider returning to the village. The prospectors silently observe these developments from their hidden defenses. As the 20-man bandit group prepare to spend the night, one member explores the vicinity and discovers Curtin in the trench. Curtin warns him away, and the bandit alerts his companions.

Gold Hat approaches Curtin and identifies his cohorts as policia montada (mounted police), searching for outlaws who robbed a train. Curtin in turn demands that they show their police badges. Gold Hat, affronted, threatens Curtin with arrest for hunting without a license and possessing unregistered firearms. Curtin brandishes his rifle and the bandits determine to lay siege to his foxhole; they prefer to take him alive so as to torture him to death for entertainment. The methods they will use matches the iconography of Catholic Church and the practice of torture by the Inquisition. The bandits wear the icons of the Virgin Mary and Saint Joseph, believing they will protect them in their endeavors.

Gold Hat tries to lure Curtin from his foxhole with promises of a gold watch. Rebutted, the outlaws construct movable barriers to assault the trench. Before they can deploy them, a company of genuine mounted police, alerted by villagers, appear and pursue Gold Hat and his gang as they flee the encampment.

With the ordeal over, Howard, Dobbs and Curtin express a desire to terminate operations and return immediately to civilization, Howard confides to Dobbs and Curtin that Lacuad is an eccentric “eternal” – a prospector who becomes obsessed over a coveted diggings and will not abandoned even after decades of failure. They leave him to his fate. Howard directs the dismantling of their mine so as to leave no trace of its existence. Howard warns his cohorts that the next phase – transferring the gold dust back to civilization – may be the riskiest phase and they become preoccupied with its challenges. Howard illustrates these dangers in his tale of the Dona Maria Mine.

Story within a Story: Legend of Dona Catalina Maria de Rodriguez and the “Dona Maria” Mine. 

Howard, Curtin, and Dobbs take leave of Lacuad and head for Durango. The threesome avoid populated areas and refrain from acting suspicious so as not to draw attention from locals. Passing through a tiny village, they are detained by Mexican officials. Expecting the worst – that they will be fined for operating an unregistered mine – the officials turn out to be medical technicians for the Health Commission vaccinating the residents for smallpox. The prospectors gladly submit to be inoculated and go their way.

Setting up camp, they are intercepted by a delegation of mounted indios. The farmers request that the American accompany them to their village: the son of one of the men has been pulled from a swimming hole unconscious and cannot be revived. Howard consents to accompany them to their village and examine the boy. There, he applies basic First Aid to the child and he recovers. The villagers regard Howard's powers as those of a medicine-man or magician.

Howard rejoins Dobbs and Curtin and they resume their journey, but they are shortly overtaken by the father of the boy he saved. The man and his companions insist that Howard return to the village so they can pay back the debt – a matter of etiquette and honor. The prospectors recognize that the indios are in earnest, and Howard relents. He relinquishes his possessions – including his share of gold – to the care of Dobbs and Curtin. They promise to rendezvous with him in Durango. Howard is welcome as a hero by the villagers upon his return.

Dobbs and Curtin, struggling to cross the high Sierra Madre, begin to quarrel in the absence of Howard's steadying influence.  Dobbs, regretting having agreed to transport Howard's gear, lashes out at Curtin. Curtin maintains his composure and shoulders most of the work. Despite this, the unstable Dobbs descends into a homicidal rage, which Curtin, though anxious, is slow to grasp. When Dobbs proposes that they abscond with Howard's share, Curtin flatly vetoes the notion. Dobbs reacts to his comrade's defense of Howard as a symptom of Bolshevism. Curtin does not deny being a socialist, but emphatically refuses to betray the old man. Though not above some unscrupulousness himself, his actions are directed toward those who have power and wealth, not against his companions. When Dobbs pulls his pistol, Curtin is thunderstruck; he realizes that Dobbs is a homicidal maniac. Curtin manages to disarm Dobbs, but cannot, on principle, bring himself to kill an unarmed man. Dobbs’ hatred and contempt for Curtin deepens when he interprets this restraint as “Bolshevik” in character.

The unarmed Dobbs bides his time in the ensuing days, taunting his bewildered companion. Curtin is forced to remain awake at night to fend off an assault by Dobbs. Exhausted, he finally slips into sleep. Dobbs instantly seizes his pistol and marches Curtin into the underbrush where he shoots him point blank. Returning minutes later to make sure the man is dead, he shoots into the prostrate body a second time.

In an attempt to rationalize his crime, Dobbs recalls that, while serving in the US military in Europe, he had killed German soldiers in combat. His conscience troubles him, but he finally falls into a deep sleep. He awakes and searches for Curtin's body, but cannot find it. He begins to hallucinate as his alienation and guilt take hold of him.

He departs camp and makes good progress towards Durango, in possession of all the gold. When he spots a locomotive in the distant valley, his anxiety fades and he contemplates a trip to the British Isles, the home of his ancestors. His only concern is that his crime will be discovered before he can cash in and escape. In sight of Durango, he is reassured that the law and order that protects property in civilized areas will assert itself. Dobbs gloats over his presumed killing of Curtin and his double-dealing of Howard.

On the outskirts of Durango, Dobbs and his pack train stumble onto three Mestizo desperados – Miguel, Nacho, and Pablo – at a secluded site off the main road. Dobbs senses his life is in danger. The Mestizos begin to ransack the packs. Dobbs pulls his pistol, only to find it is unloaded. After one of the Mestizos knocks Dobbs to the ground with a rock to the head, Miguel, the leader of the gang, decapitates the stunned Dobbs with a machete. The men don his boots and pants but leave his bloody shirt behind, and escape with the pack train.

The outlaws, upon examining the contents of the pack, find only what appears to be sand in burlap bags. They guess that this is ballast placed in the packs to inflate the value by weight of commercial hides, or perhaps samples taken by a mining company engineer. They cannot fathom that it could be a fortune in placer gold. Frustrated at the paucity of loot, they slash the bags and contents pour out, swept away by the wind.

The desperados travel to a tiny village in the high Sierra Madre and offer the stolen burros for sale. The village elders casually examine the animals and the men's outfits. The brands on the burros are recognized as those sold to three prospectors months before. The village mayor is sent for; he engages the three Mestizos in an unassuming, yet probing interrogation regarding their acquisition of the burros and packs. The thieves are equivocal. The mayor quietly assembles the men of the village. After further cross-examination and more inconsistences in the scenario, a posse is sent to locate Dobbs and discover his decapitated remains. The local military garrison is notified, and a captain arrives with a platoon of troopers to take the Mestizos into custody. While being marched back to the garrison, the accused murderers are shot to death while trying to “escape”. Their corpses are buried where they fell, with a cynical display of decorum.

Curtin, wounded and barely alive, is found crawling through the underbrush by a local woodsman.  He takes Curtin to his home, and Howard is notified that a gringo needs medical care. When Howard arrives, Curtin relates his ordeal with Dobbs, and swears revenge. Howard, reflecting on the incident, and without exonerating Dobbs, does not consider him a natural killer. The old timer points to the temptation of $50,000 in gold, and declares that any person might be tempted to murder for it. The two men agree to pursue Dobbs and retrieve their fortunes – not yet knowing Dobbs’ fate.

While Curtin convalesces, Howard embarks for Durango, but he is intercepted by the mayor who presided over the interrogation of Dobbs’ murderers and tells him the story. Howard is informed that the gold has been lost. He returns to his village and relates the tragic news to Curtin. Grasping the enormity of the disaster, Howard roars with Homeric laughter. Curtin is at first offended, distraught at the loss of the fortune, but finally joins the old prospector in his ironic mirth.

Howard is content to remain in the village as a medicine-man and offers Curtin to accompany him as an apprentice doctor.

Howard remains enthusiastic about a life as an honored member of the Indio community. Curtin bids Howard farewell, and promises to visit his old comrade when he fully recovers.

Adaptations

Film
 John Huston successfully adapted the book as a 1948 film of the same name.
 The 1984 made-for-television movie Wet Gold has been called an unofficial remake of The Treasure of the Sierra Madre, borrowing the basic storyline but set in the modern-day Caribbean and concerning a sunken treasure of gold bars.

Television
  Episode 3 of the first season of the 1955 TV series Cheyenne gives a writing credit (novel) to B. Traven, and contains the same basic plot as the novel, with the main character, Cheyenne, standing in the role of the old prospector, Howard, of the original story.

Video games
 The first DLC for the game Fallout: New Vegas, titled Dead Money, borrows from the basic themes of the novel, with some post-apocalyptic twists, replacing the Sierra Madre mountains with the ruins of a casino known as the Sierra Madre, and having the antagonist of the DLC "solving" the novel's issue of greed by equipping the player character and all of the other NPCs in the DLC with bomb collars equipped with dead man's switches, so that if one of the group dies, they all die.

References

Further reading

External links
 Full text of Der Schatz der Sierra Madre (German) at HathiTrust Digital Library

Full text of
"https://www.fadedpage.com/showbook.php?pid=20221058" (English) at Faded Page ebook Archive

1927 German-language novels
Novels set in Mexico
German novels adapted into films
Fiction about mining